Pickering—Scarborough East was a federal electoral district in Ontario, Canada, that had been represented in the House of Commons of Canada from 2004 to 2015.

The district was created in 2003 from 44.1% of Pickering—Ajax—Uxbridge, 39.7% of Scarborough East, and 0.1% of Scarborough—Rouge River ridings.

Following the Canadian federal electoral redistribution, 2012, the riding was redistributed between Pickering—Uxbridge and Scarborough—Rouge Park.

The district consisted of the southwest part of the city of Pickering and the southeast part of the Scarborough district of Toronto. It was the only riding to overlap the boundaries of the 416 (City of Toronto) and the 905 (Greater Toronto Area) regions.

Specifically, it consisted of the part of the City of Pickering lying south and west of a line drawn from the western city limit east along Finch Avenue, south along Valley Farm Road, northeast along Highway 401 and south along Brock Road to the southern city limit; and the part of the City of Toronto lying south and east of a line drawn from the eastern city limit west along Finch Avenue East, south along Meadowvale Road, west along Sheppard Avenue East, south along Morningside Avenue and southeast along Highland Creek to Lake Ontario.

Demographics
(According to the Canada 2006 Census)

Ethnic groups: 61.3% White, 13.5% South Asian, 10.4% Black, 4.1% Filipino, 3.2% Chinese  
Languages: 74.6% English, 1.3% French, 23.9% Other 
Average income: $31 920

Member of Parliament

This riding has elected the following Member of Parliament:

Election results

See also
 List of Canadian federal electoral districts
 Past Canadian electoral districts

References

Riding history from the Library of Parliament
 [Pickering—Scarborough East 2011 results from Elections Canada]
 Campaign expense data from Elections Canada

Notes

Former federal electoral districts of Ontario
Federal electoral districts of Toronto
Pickering, Ontario
Scarborough, Toronto